Gordon Joshua Wasserman, Baron Wasserman (born 26 July 1938) is a Canadian Conservative politician and member of the House of Lords who has been Government Adviser on Policing and Criminal Justice since 2011.

Career 

Born in Canada, Wasserman was educated at Westmount High School, McGill University and New College, Oxford on a Rhodes Scholarship. He joined the Home Office as a civil servant in 1967 and worked variously as Economic Adviser, in the Urban Deprivation Unit and as an Assistant Under Secretary of State responsible successively for social policy and policing.

In his subsequent private sector career, Wasserman served as a consultant in public sector and police management, particularly in the use of science and technology in policing. He worked with the Police Commissioners of New York City, Philadelphia and Miami as well as the Department of Justice.

He was created a life peer as Baron Wasserman, of Pimlico in the City of Westminster, on 11 January 2011.

Personal life 

Wasserman married in 1964 the Hon. Cressida Gaitskell, younger daughter of Hugh Gaitskell and Dora Gaitskell, Baroness Gaitskell.

References

1938 births
Living people
McGill University alumni
Alumni of New College, Oxford
Conservative Party (UK) life peers
British Jews
Canadian emigrants to England
Civil servants in the Home Office
British management consultants
Jewish British politicians
Life peers created by Elizabeth II